Brigus Junction is a designated place in the Canadian province of Newfoundland and Labrador.

The community was mainly used as a railway junction for the Newfoundland Railway that split the mainline (St. John's - Port Aux Basques) and the Carbonear Branchline.

Geography 
Brigus Junction is in Newfoundland within Subdivision O of Division No. 1.

Demographics 

See also 
List of communities in Newfoundland and Labrador
List of designated places in Newfoundland and Labrador

References 

Designated places in Newfoundland and Labrador